This article contains an overview of the year 1997 in athletics.

Major Events

World

IAAF Grand Prix Final
World Championships
World Cross Country Championships
World Half Marathon Championships
World Indoor Championships
World Race Walking Cup
World Student Games

Regional

CARIFTA Games
Central American and Caribbean Championships
East Asian Games
European Cross Country Championships
European Junior Championships
European U23 Championships
Mediterranean Games
Pan American Junior Championships
South American Championships
South American Junior Championships

World records

Men

Women

Awards

Men

Women

Season's bests

Notes

References

 
Athletics (track and field) by year